Cardinal Stritch Catholic High School (CSCHS), is a private, Catholic, coeducational, college prep secondary school located in Oregon, Ohio. It is part of the Roman Catholic Diocese of Toledo.

History
The groundbreaking for the school was performed on September 21, 1960 by then-bishop of Toledo, Bishop George J. Rehring. The first class entered the following fall. The school is named for Samuel Cardinal Stritch, the second bishop of Toledo during the years of 1921 through 1930, and eventually cardinal archbishop of Chicago.

On the school's website it states, "A twenty-acre site was chosen for the East Side area's first co-institutional high school." One side of the school was originally reserved for boys' classes, while the other was for girls', with co-educational classes being held in the center sections. (The separate wings were integrated in 1971 when all classes became co-educational.) The first principal was Monsignor Michael Walz, who initiated the "Stritch Family" concept.

The high school has also taken on leadership roles in the creation of the "Live It" initiative and the Kateri Education Project, a regional study of Catholic education. They have adopted a service learning program, "Stewards of Stritch", moved from monthly to weekly Mass for all of its students, and helped the entire high school community focus toward the Eucharist as the source and summit of the faith and therefore, at the center of the school.

National Honor Roll
In the years 2006, 2007, 2008 and 2009, Cardinal Stritch Catholic High School was named one of the Top 50 Catholic High Schools by the Catholic High School Honor Roll. In 2018, Cardinal Stritch was named a Top Workplace by the Toledo Blade and Energage.

50 Year Anniversary of Cardinal Stritch
On May 19, 2011, the school celebrated its 50-year anniversary with a mass presided by Bishop Leonard P. Blair. It was announced that the school would add the word "Catholic" to its official name and a brand new school logo was unveiled. Cardinal Stritch High School is now officially known as Cardinal Stritch Catholic High School.

Ohio High School Athletic Association State Championships

 Wrestling - 1985

Notable alumni
Bryan Smolinski, professional ice hockey player for the Chicago Blackhawks

References

External links
Cardinal Stritch High School

Catholic secondary schools in Ohio
Educational institutions established in 1960
High schools in Lucas County, Ohio
1960 establishments in Ohio